Marisa Hamamoto is a Japanese-American professional dancer and social entrepreneur based in California, United States. She is the founder and artistic director of Infinite Flow, a Los Angeles-based nonprofit and professional dance company composed of dancers with and without disabilities.

Biography

Early life 
Hamamoto was born in Aichi Prefecture, Japan, and raised in Irvine, California. She received her dance training from Kirov Academy of Ballet in Washington, D.C., and the Idyllwild Arts Academy. Later, she graduated from Keio University in Tokyo, Japan with a BA in 2007 and MA in 2009.

In 2010, she received an apprenticeship at a ballroom dance school in Japan and returned to Southern California in 2011. While taking a dance class in 2006, she was paralyzed from the neck down due to a disease called spinal cord infarction. She recovered most of her mobility and walked out of the hospital two months after the diagnosis. In 2014, she witnessed wheelchair dancing at the Abilities Expo in Los Angeles and became interested in the area of dance and disability. She is also a graduate of Red Bull Amphiko, a program by Red Bull supporting social entrepreneurs.

Career 
Hamamoto is an inclusion speaker, choreographer, and professional dancer. She has worked as an instructor and actress in Los Angeles. In March 2015, she founded Infinite Flow - An Inclusive Dance Company. It is a nonprofit and professional wheelchair ballroom dance company composed of dancers with and without disabilities. The company uses dance to inspire social inclusion and innovation.

For dance events and shows, Hamamoto partners with Adelfo Cerame Jr., a paraplegic bodybuilder and Piotr Iwanicki, a wheelchair dancesport world champion.

Recognition
Hamamoto was recognized in 2019 by Dance-Teacher magazine for her commitment and service in the field of dance. She was also a recipient of San Fernando Valley Business Journal's Women in Business Awards.

References 

Year of birth missing (living people)
Living people
People from Aichi Prefecture
Japanese emigrants to the United States
American people of Japanese descent
Japanese-American culture in California
Keio University alumni
People from Irvine, California
American women choreographers
American choreographers
Japanese choreographers
Businesspeople from California
Dancers from California
American dancers of Asian descent
American female dancers
Japanese female dancers
21st-century American women